The Education functional constituency, formerly called Teaching from 1985 to 1995, is a functional constituency in the elections for the Legislative Council of Hong Kong. It was one of the 12 functional constituency seats created for the 1985 Legislative Council election. Since 1998, It has been the functional constituency with the most registered voters, including registered teachers, principals, managers of schools, full-time academic staff, members of the councils of the universities in Hong Kong and board of governors of the institutes of higher educations. In 2020, it had 85,698 registered voters, as compared to the Finance constituency who had only 121 voters.

The constituency was historically one of the few pro-democracy strongholds in the functional constituencies. For most of its history it was held by the Hong Kong Professional Teachers' Union (PTU), the largest teachers' union in Hong Kong, and was held by PTU president Szeto Wah until he switched to a geographical constituency direct election in the 1991 election. He was succeeded by Cheung Man-kwong who held the seat from 1991 to 2012. Beginning in 2012, it was represented by Ip Kin-yuen until he resigned en masse from the office with other pro-democrats in protest to Beijing's disqualification of the four pro-democracy legislators.

Composition
The Education functional constituency is composed of—
 full-time academic staff engaged in teaching or research and administrative staff of equivalent rank in the following institutions—
 institutions of higher education funded through the University Grants Committee;
 approved post secondary colleges registered under the Post Secondary Colleges Ordinance;
 technical colleges established under the Vocational Training Council Ordinance;
 The Hong Kong Academy for Performing Arts;
 The Open University of Hong Kong; and
 full-time academic staff engaged in teaching or research and administrative staff of equivalent rank in the institutions which—
 offer post secondary education leading to the award of any qualification entered into the Qualifications Register established under the Accreditation of Academic and Vocational Qualifications Ordinance; and
 are set up by—
 an institution of higher education funded through the University Grants Committee;
 The Hong Kong Academy for Performing Arts; or
 The Open University of Hong Kong; and 
 members of each of the following bodies—
 Council of the University of Hong Kong;
 Council of The Chinese University of Hong Kong;
 Council of The Hong Kong University of Science and Technology;
 Council of the City University of Hong Kong;
 Council of The Hong Kong Polytechnic University;
 Council of The Hong Kong Academy for Performing Arts;
 Council of The Open University of Hong Kong;
 the Vocational Training Council; 
 Council of The Education University of Hong Kong; 
 Council of the Hong Kong Baptist University;
 Council of Lingnan University; 
 Board of Governors of the Hong Kong Shue Yan University
 Board of Governors of the Caritas Institute of Higher Education;
 Board of Governors of the Chu Hai College of Higher Education;
 Board of Governors of the Centennial College;
 Board of Governors of the Tung Wah College; 
 Board of Governors of The Hang Seng University of Hong Kong; 
 Board of Governors of the Hong Kong Nang Yan College of Higher Education; 
 Board of Governors of the HKCT Institute of Higher Education;
 Board of Governors of the Gratia Christian College; 
 Board of Governors of Yew Chung College of Early Childhood Education; and
 registered teachers registered under the Education Ordinance; and
 permitted teachers engaged in full-time employment in schools registered or provisionally registered under the Education Ordinance; and
 teachers and principals of schools entirely maintained and controlled by the Government; and
 persons whose principal or only employment is that of full-time teaching with the following institutions—
 technical institutes, industrial training centres or skills centres established under the Vocational Training Council Ordinance;
 industrial training centres established under the repealed Industrial Training (Construction Industry) Ordinance (Cap. 317) and maintained under the Construction Industry Council Ordinance;
 industrial training centres established under the Construction Industry Council Ordinance;
 industrial training centres established under the Industrial Training (Clothing Industry) Ordinance;
 Hong Chi Association—Hong Chi Pinehill Integrated Vocational Training Centre; 
 Caritas Lok Mo Integrated Vocational Training Centre of Caritas—Hong Kong incorporated under the Caritas—Hong Kong Incorporation Ordinance; and
 registered managers of schools registered under the Education Ordinance.

Return members

Teaching (1985–1995)

Education (1995–present)

Electoral results

2020s

2010s

2000s

1990s

1980s

References

Constituencies of Hong Kong
Constituencies of Hong Kong Legislative Council
Functional constituencies (Hong Kong)
1995 establishments in Hong Kong
Constituencies established in 1995